The following highways are numbered 407:

Canada
 Manitoba Provincial Road 407
 Newfoundland and Labrador Route 407
 Ontario Highway 407

Costa Rica
 National Route 407

Iceland
Route 407 (Iceland)

Italy
 State road 407

Japan
 Japan National Route 407

United Kingdom
A407 road (Great Britain)

United States
  Florida State Road 407
  Georgia State Route 407 (unsigned designation for Interstate 285)
  Louisiana Highway 407
  Maryland Route 407
 New York:
  New York State Route 407 (former)
  County Route 407 (Erie County, New York)
  Pennsylvania Route 407
  Puerto Rico Highway 407
  South Dakota Highway 407
  Farm to Market Road 407
  Virginia State Route 407
  Washington State Route 407 (former)